Health Mart is an independent pharmacy franchise with more than 5,000 member pharmacies across all 50 states. Each pharmacy is locally owned and operated, allowing Health Mart pharmacy owners to tailor their offerings to the specific communities they serve.

The Health Mart franchise is owned by Health Mart Systems, Inc., which is part of McKesson Corporation.

History 
In 1996 McKesson acquired FoxMeyer drug company. With this acquisition came the Health Mart franchise, which started with several hundred pharmacies. Since McKesson's acquisition of Health Mart, the franchise has expanded rapidly, and has received many awards from leading pharmaceutical industry publications.

Awards/Recognition 
In 2007, Health Mart was named "Chain of the Year" by Drug Topics.

In 2011, Health Mart topped traditional chain drug stores in terms of pharmacy customer satisfaction in a JD Power study.

In 2013, Health Mart was recognized by Drug Store News as the nation's largest independent pharmacy franchise and one of the fastest growing drug store networks of any kind with more than 3,100 member stores.

In 2018, J.D. Power gave Health Mart the second-highest score in its rankings of brick-and-mortar chain drugstores.

Leadership 
In January 2019, Health Mart announced it had hired Nimesh Jhaveri, formerly of Walgreens, to serve as its president.

Partnerships 
In 2019, Health Mart announced a partnership with Amazon Hub Counter to allow its pharmacies to operate as package pickup locations.

In 2020, Health Mart began working with the Department of Health and Human Services (HHS) to act as the community pharmacy representative for their Ready, Set, PrEP program. The Ready, Set, PrEP program provides pre-exposure prophylaxis (PrEP) medications to at-risk individuals at no cost. More than 3,300 Health Mart pharmacies signed on to donate their dispensing fees as part of the program.

During the COVID-19 pandemic, Health Mart again worked with HHS to develop COVID-19 test collection sites at Health Mart pharmacies selected by HHS.

References

External links
 Official website

Pharmacies of the United States